Yevgeni Aleksandrovich Falkovskiy (born 4 May 1985) is a Russian professional football coach and a former player. He is an assistant coach with FC Rassvet Krasnoyarsk.

Club career
He made his debut for FC Torpedo Moscow on 6 March 2005 in a Russian Cup game against FC Metallurg Lipetsk.

External links
 
 

1985 births
Sportspeople from Krasnoyarsk
Living people
Russian footballers
Association football midfielders
FC Torpedo Moscow players
FC Torpedo Vladimir players